The Democratic Party was formed in 1942, during the Second World War by Major Norman Leith-Hay-Clark.  It was supportive of free enterprise but also called for limits on excessive individual incomes.

It managed to recruit various converts from the Conservative Party and stood in the 1945 general election but without any success. Led by Major N. Leith-Hay-Clarke, the party was also noted for its anti-Semitic stance. Shortly after, it was renamed the Independent Democratic Party and was active in investigating what it described as "cases of personal hardship" until at least 1961, although it had long ceased direct political activity.

Election results

References

Defunct political parties in the United Kingdom
Political parties established in 1942
1942 establishments in the United Kingdom
Political parties with year of disestablishment missing